The Hellenic Coast Guard is the national coast guard of Greece. Like many other coast guards, it is a paramilitary organization that can support the Hellenic Navy in wartime, but resides under separate civilian control in times of peace. The officers and the enlisted members of Coast Guard are regarded as military  personnel under Military's Penal Code. It was founded in 1919 by an Act of Parliament (Law No. 1753–1919) and the legal framework for its function was reformed in 1927. Its primary mission is the enforcement of Greek, European and International law in the maritime areas.

Historically, it is very closely associated with the Greek shipping industry; many Coast Guard officers retire early to find employment in Greek and international companies owned by Greek ship-owners.

Role and responsibilities 
The main activities of the Hellenic Coast Guard are defined in the present legislation and specified within its institutional framework of operation. These activities are the following:

 Ensuring public order, including general policing and traffic policing.
 Safeguarding of public and state security.
 Law enforcement at sea, ports and coastal areas.Maritime border control. Surveillance of the sea, shipping, ports and borders. Drug interdiction.
 search and rescue (jointly with the Hellenic Air Force and Hellenic Navy).
 Safety of navigation (with the exception of lighthouses, racons and buoys, which are constructed, purchased, installed and maintained by the Hellenic Navy Lighthouse Service).
 Protection of the marine environment and response to marine pollution incidents.
 Provision of emergency maritime radio communication services.

 Port operations (excluding port pilots service).
 Merchant Ships and Shipping Companies inspection.
 Representation of Greece in international organizations and the European Commission in matters related to these roles.

In order to perform these roles, the Coast Guard operate a number of patrol boats of various sizes (6m to 60m) and different types (RIBs, coastal patrol boats, offshore patrol boats, lifeboats and pollution control vessels). On land the Hellenic Coast Guard is equipped with 634 vehicles, including patrol vehicles, cars and motorcycles, buses and mini vans, trucks and tanker. The Coast Guard also operate seven airplanes and six helicopters.

Organization

The Hellenic Coast Guard is under the authority of the Ministry of Shipping and Island Policy, which is headed by a commandant and assisted by two deputy commandant who all have the rank of vice admiral. , Theodoros Kliaris serves as Commandant of the Hellenic Coast Guard, Nikolaos An. Isakoglou as first deputy commandant and Georgios Alexandrakis as second deputy commandant.

The Hellenic Coast Guard operates the Maritime Rescue Coordination Center (MRCC) in Piraeus and the Emergency Radio Communications Station SXE at Aspropyrgos. The Hellenic Coast Guard also operates the Vessel Traffic Service (V.T.M.I.S.) at busy sea lanes, currently around the ports of Piraeus, Elefsis, Lavrion and Rafina.

Between May 21, 1964, and 1980 the Hellenic Coast Guard had its own special flag, which was derived from the Greek Ensign with the addition of the crossed anchors badge on the center of the white cross.

Personnel
Most officers in recent years are graduates from higher education establishments, including the Merchant Marine Academies. After recruitment new officers study for four years at the Hellenic Naval Academy. Petty officers are trained for two years at Palaskas Naval Training Centre and lower rank enlisted men are trained at Scholi Limenofylakon at Piraeus, for a duration of two years. With law Law 4029 of 2011, a volunteer Auxiliary Coast Guard was established. The Officers of the Hellenic Coast Guard have the same ranks as the Officers of the Hellenic Navy and similar insignia, replacing the curl with two crossed anchors. The Petty Officers (Ratings) also use rank insignia similar to those of the Hellenic Navy, replacing the speciality symbol with the crossed anchors badge.

Ranks and insignia

Commissioned officers

NCOs and enlisted

Fleet
As of 2015, the structure of the Hellenic Coast Guard predicts a fleet consisting of five Offshore Patrol Vessels (OPVs) sized 45–60 metres in length and of 300-450 tonnes displacement, six to twelve Patrol boats with lengths of 25–30 metres and more than fifty Coastal Patrol Vessels of various types with lengths of 14–20 metres. In addition the Hellenic Coast Guard operates a large number of fast Rigid-Inflatable Boat (RIB)/Special Forces vessels as well as eleven Lifeboats. Currently the Hellenic Coast Guard fleet in its totality consists of approximately 240 vessels of all types.

Aircraft fleet 
The Hellenic Coast Guard operates a small fleet of fixed wing aircraft based at Tatoi (Dekelia) Air Base, (LGTT).

HCG facilities

 New headquarters and VTMIS operations centre (Pireaus): 
 Old headquarters and SAR coordination centre (Pireaus): 
 Mooring for Open Sea Patrol Vessels (Keratsini): 
 Coast Guard apron at Tatoi Air Base: 
 Aspropyrgos Maritime Communications Radio Station SXE: 
 Piraeus Central Port Authority: 
 Enlisted men training facility (Σχολή Λιμενοφυλάκων): 
 Piraeus VTMIS AIS receiver 002393200 
 Psyttaleia Island VTMIS AIS receiver 002391100 
 Patras VTS 
 Thessaloniki VTS 
 Corfu Island VTS 
 Igoumenitsa VTS 
 Lavrion VTS 
 Rafina Port

References

External links

Hellenic Coast Guard official website

 
1919 establishments in Greece
Coast Guard
Coast guards
Border guards
Borders of Greece
Emergency services in Greece